Maravarman is a given name. Notable people with the name include:

Arikesari Maravarman, Pandyan king who ruled the ancient Tamil kingdom between 670 and 710 AD
Maravarman Kulasekara Pandyan I, Pandyan king, who ruled regions of South India between 1268 and 1308 AD
Maravarman Rajasimha I, early Pandyan kings
Maravarman Rajasimha II, the last Pandyan king of the first Pandyan empire
Maravarman Sundara Pandyan, Pandyan king who ruled regions of South India between 1216 and 1238 AD
Maravarman Sundara Pandyan II, Pandyan king, who ruled regions of South India between 1238 and 1240 AD
Maravarman Vikkiraman II, Pandyan king, who ruled regions of South India between 1250 and 1251 AD